The Exterior Gateway Protocol (EGP) was a routing protocol used to connect different autonomous systems on the Internet from the mid-1980s until the mid-1990s, when it was replaced by Border Gateway Protocol (BGP).

History
EGP was developed by Bolt, Beranek and Newman in the early 1980s. It was first described in RFC 827 and formally specified in RFC 904.

RFC 1772 outlined a migration path from EGP to BGP.

References

See also
 Interior gateway protocol

Internet protocols
Internet Standards
Routing protocols